Ivanna Yastremska is a Ukrainian junior tennis player. She is the younger sister of professional player Dayana Yastremska.

Career
Ivanna won two singles matches in 2021; against Yelyzaveta Sylka at the Ukrainian Junior Open (in June), and against Alina Kornieieva at the Aizenshtadt Memorial tournament in August. She is yet to win a match on the ITF Junior Circuit, ITF Women's Circuit, or the WTA Tour.

Yastremska made her WTA main draw debut at the 2022 WTA Lyon Open in the doubles draw partnering her sister Dayana. They also featured in the Indian Wells Masters later in the year.

Personal life
Yastremska is the younger sister of fellow tennis player Dayana. During the 2022 Russian invasion of Ukraine, the Yastremska sisters fled the country through Romania and escaped to France, sheltering in a hotel in Lyon. The sisters were awarded a main draw wildcard into the doubles draw at the 2022 WTA Lyon Open. Their parents and other family members stayed behind in Ukraine.

References

External links
 
 
 Ivanna Yastremska profile on CoreTennis

Living people
Ukrainian female tennis players
Sportspeople from Odesa
2007 births
Ukrainian refugees